Bullet Park is a 1969 novel by American Novelist John Cheever about an earnest yet pensive father Eliot Nailles and his troubled son Tony, and their predestined fate with a psychotic man Hammer, who moves to Bullet Park to sacrifice one of them.

Adaptations
In 2008, the novel was adapted into a French-language film, Parc.

In 2009, Audible.com produced an audio version of Bullet Park, narrated by Marc Vietor, as part of its Modern Vanguard line of audiobooks.

References

1969 American novels
Novels by John Cheever
Alfred A. Knopf books
American novels adapted into films
Novels set in New York (state)
Books with cover art by Paul Bacon